Strășeni (latter Russian name used in Moldovan Russian-language media) is a city and municipality of about 20,000 inhabitants in central Moldova, the administrative center of Strășeni District. The city administers one village, Făgureni.

There are several legends about its name. One tells that the name of the region is derived from strașnic, a Romanian adjective that can mean "scary", "terrible", and the story goes that in former times this region was covered by a fearsome forest.

Nowadays, Strășeni is famous for its wine. A little farther north is the Romănești winery, one of the largest locally and the one-time leading producer of wines in the USSR. One of its more famous products is a Bordeaux-type red.

Media
 Vocea Basarabiei 102.3

Points of interest
 Strășeni TV Mast, a 355-metre (1165') tall guyed mast for FM radio and TV broadcasting built in 1984–85.

Twin towns and sister cities
 Onești, Romania (2015)

References

Cities and towns in Moldova
Municipalities of Moldova
Strășeni District